Boondocks are remote, usually brushy areas.

Boondocks may also refer to:

 The Boondocks (band), an Estonian rock band
 The Boondocks (comic strip), a comic strip by Aaron McGruder
 The Boondocks (2005 TV series), the television series based on the aforementioned comic strip
 The Boondocks (cancelled TV series), a cancelled reboot of the aforementioned television series
 "Boondocks" (song), a 2005 song by Little Big Town
 Boondocks Road, a road in Texas
 The Boondock Saints, a 1999 action crime drama film
 "Down in the Boondocks" (song), a 1965 song by Billy Joe Royal
 Boondock, a fictional settlement in the Lazarus Long novel series by Robert A. Heinlein; see

See also
 Boondox (born 1985), rapper